David Allan Bednar (born June 15, 1952) is a member of the Quorum of the Twelve Apostles of the Church of Jesus Christ of Latter-day Saints (LDS Church). A former educator, Bednar was president of Brigham Young University–Idaho (BYU–Idaho) from 1997 to 2004.

Bednar was sustained as a member of the Quorum of the Twelve on October 2, 2004, the youngest man named to that body since Dallin H. Oaks in 1984. He was ordained an apostle on October 7, 2004, by church president Gordon B. Hinckley. Bednar and Dieter F. Uchtdorf were called to fill the vacancies created by the July 2004 deaths of quorum members David B. Haight and Neal A. Maxwell. As a member of the Quorum of the Twelve, Bednar is recognized by the church as a prophet, seer, and revelator. He is currently the seventh most senior apostle in the church.

Life and career
Bednar was born in Oakland, California to Lavina Whitney Bednar and Anthony George Bednar. His mother came from a long line of Latter-day Saints, but his father did not join the church until Bednar was in his late twenties. He served as a full-time missionary in Southern Germany and then attended Brigham Young University, where he received a Bachelor of Arts degree in communication in 1976 and a Master of Arts degree in organizational communication in 1977. He received a doctorate degree in organizational behavior from Purdue University in 1980.

From 1980 to 1984, Bednar was an assistant professor of management at the University of Arkansas College of Business Administration (now Sam M. Walton College of Business). He was an assistant professor of management at Texas Tech University from 1984 to 1986. He returned to the University of Arkansas in 1987, serving as the Associate Dean for Graduate Studies in the Sam M. Walton College of Business until 1992, and was then the director of the Management Decision-Making Lab from 1992 to 1997. In 1994, he was recognized as the outstanding teacher at the University of Arkansas and received the Burlington Northern Foundation Award for Excellence in Teaching. He was twice the recipient of the Outstanding Teacher Award in the College of Business Administration.

Bednar served as the president of Ricks College/BYU–Idaho in Rexburg, Idaho, from July 1, 1997 to December 1, 2004. There, he oversaw and managed the transition of the school from, what was at the time, the largest private junior college in the United States, Ricks College, to a four-year university, BYU–Idaho.

LDS Church service
Bednar has served in the LDS Church as a bishop (Fayetteville Ward, 1987), twice as stake president (Fort Smith Arkansas Stake, 1987–91 and Rogers Arkansas Stake, 1991–95), regional representative (1994–95), and area seventy (1997–2004).

In 2016, Bednar dedicated the Star Valley Wyoming Temple, the LDS Church's 154th temple.

Bednar attended the 2019 dedication of the Rome Italy Temple with all 15 of the LDS Church apostles. This is believed to be the first time the entire First Presidency and Quorum of the Twelve Apostles were in the same location outside the United States.

Controversy
In 2016, Bednar attracted media attention when he claimed the church doesn't discriminate against gay and lesbian people because "there are no homosexual members of the church."  He stated that being gay or lesbian is not the primary identity of individuals, but rather that each individual is first a child of God.

Personal life
Bednar married Susan Kae Robinson in the Salt Lake Temple on March 20, 1975.  He and his wife are currently living in the Salt Lake area.  The Bednars have three sons.

Works
Books

Academic articles

Awards
Burlington Northern Foundation Award for Excellence in Teaching (1994)

See also

 Council on the Disposition of the Tithes

References

Further reading

External links

General Authorities and General Officers: Elder David A. Bednar
Bednar on Special Witnesses of Christ

1952 births
20th-century Mormon missionaries
American general authorities (LDS Church)
American Mormon missionaries in Germany
Apostles (LDS Church)
Area seventies (LDS Church)
Brigham Young University alumni
Living people
People from Oakland, California
Presidents of Brigham Young University–Idaho
Purdue University alumni
Regional representatives of the Twelve
Texas Tech University faculty
University of Arkansas faculty
Latter Day Saints from California
Latter Day Saints from Arkansas